J.M. Olds Collegiate is a high school located in Twillingate, Newfoundland and Labrador, Canada. It currently has an enrollment of 111 students and 10 teachers. It operates under the Newfoundland and Labrador English School District, formerly the Nova Central School District.

History

The school is named after Dr. John McKee Olds (March 27, 1906 - September 6, 1985) Dr. Olds practiced medicine in the town of Twillingate for over 49 years. The school was originally named Central High and was renamed to J.M. Olds Collegiate on March 22, 1980 in his honour.

Academics

J.M. Olds Collegiate follows the standard Newfoundland and Labrador curriculum, offering general, academic, and advanced courses. The standard courses include English, Mathematics, Science, Physics, Biology, Chemistry, French, Physical Education, Social Studies, Career, Art and Music classes as well as electives such as Newfoundland Studies, Nutrition, Skilled Trades, Philosophy, Clothing, and Textiles.

Student Council

The Student Council members for the 2022-2023 school year is as follows.

Extracurriculars

The school has junior and senior volleyball, basketball, softball, soccer, badminton, ball hockey and frisbee teams. The schools official mascot is a tiger.
The school also has a Drama Club, Art Club, Creative Writing Club, and a Cricket Club.

See also
Twillingate Island Elementary
Twillingate

References

External links
J.M. Olds Collegiate

High schools in Newfoundland and Labrador
Educational institutions in Canada with year of establishment missing